Odunpazarı (literally "firewood market" in Turkish) is a historic district of Eskişehir Province in the Central Anatolia region of Turkey. Odunpazarı is one of the central districts of Eskişehir along with the district of Tepebaşı.

Historic buildings
Alaeddin Mosque
Kurşunlu Mosque and Complex

Museums in Odunpazarı
Eskişehir Meerschaum Museum
Museum of Independence, Eskişehir
Museum of Modern Glass Art, Eskişehir
Tayfun Talipoğlu Typewriter Museum
Yılmaz Büyükerşen Wax Museum

References

External links

  Eskişehir governor's official website
  District municipality's official website
 Miscellaneous images of Odunpazarı, Eskişehir

 
Populated places in Eskişehir Province
Districts of Eskişehir Province
World Heritage Tentative List for Turkey